Pothuraju Parthasarthy (born 1 July 1916) was an Indian politician who was a member of 4th Lok Sabha from Rajampet (Lok Sabha constituency) in Andhra Pradesh State, India. He was born in Kodur, Cuddapah District.

Parthasarthy was elected to 5th, 6th and 7th Lok Sabha from Rajampet.

References

1916 births
Possibly living people
People from Kadapa district
India MPs 1967–1970
India MPs 1971–1977
India MPs 1977–1979
India MPs 1980–1984
Andhra Pradesh politicians
Lok Sabha members from Andhra Pradesh
Indian National Congress politicians from Andhra Pradesh